Ricing may refer to:

 Rice burner, a pejorative ("ricing or modifying a Japanese car")
 Ricing (cooking), to pass food through a food mill or "ricer"
 Processing rice using a Rice huller
 Processing rice using a Rice polisher